Liolaemus tajzara is a species of lizard in the family Iguanidae or the family Liolaemidae. The species is endemic to Bolivia.

References
 

tajzara
Lizards of South America
Reptiles of Bolivia
Endemic fauna of Bolivia
Reptiles described in 2019